The Shipra Express (pronounced as Shiprã Express) is a tri-weekly superfast express train of Indian Railways, which runs between Indore Junction railway station of Indore, the largest city & commercial hub of Central Indian state Madhya Pradesh and Howrah, the commercial hub of Kolkata. The name 'Kshipra' signifies the Shipra River, one of the holiest river of Hindus near Ujjain City.

Coach composition

The train consists of 22 LHB coach;

 AC II Tier: 1
 EOG cum Luggage Rake: 2
 AC III Tier: 4
 General Unreserved: 4
 Sleeper class: 11

Service

The 22911/Shipra Express has an average speed of 56 km/hr and covers 1738 km in 31 hrs 20 mins.

The 22912/Shipra Express has an average speed of 55 km/hr and covers 1738 km in 31 hrs 50 mins.

Route & Halts

The important halts of the train are :

Schedule

Rake sharing

The train shares its rake with Indore–Rajendra Nagar Terminal Express.

Direction reversal

Train reverses its direction at:

Traction

Both trains are hauled by a Vadodara Loco Shed-based WAP-7 electric locomotive from Indore Junction to Howrah Junction and vice versa.

See also

 Avantika Express

References

Transport in Indore
Rail transport in Howrah
Transport in Ujjain
Express trains in India
Railway services introduced in 1999
Rail transport in Madhya Pradesh
Rail transport in Uttar Pradesh
Rail transport in Bihar
Rail transport in Jharkhand
Rail transport in West Bengal
Named passenger trains of India